Puma Ranra (Quechua puma cougar, puma, ranra stony place) erroneously also spelled Pumrangra) is a mountain in the Wansu mountain range in the Andes of Peru, about  high. It is situated in the Arequipa Region, Condesuyos Province, Cayarani District. Puma Ranra lies south of Janq'u Q'awa and Saxa Q'awa at the Puma Ranra valley (Pumaranra) in the west.

References 

Mountains of Peru
Mountains of Arequipa Region